The Life and Times of Xaviera Hollander (also known as The Life and Times of the Happy Hooker, Inside Xaviera Hollander) is a 1974 American pornographic comedy film produced and directed by Larry G. Spangler. Based on the memoir The Happy Hooker by Xaviera Hollander, the film stars Samantha McLaren as Hollander, a Dutch immigrant who became a well-known call girl and eventual madam.

Independently produced, it was very successful financially, earning over three times its budget.

Plot
The film follows the sexual exploits of a Dutch prostitute in her climb from schoolgirl to madam.

Cast
 Xaviera Hollander (introduction only)
 Samantha McLaren
 Karen Stacy
 Franklin Anthony
 John Holmes
 Keith Erickson
 Rick Cassidy
 Rick Lutze (as Rick Lutz)
 Betty Hunt
 Paula Stone
 Sylvia Reasoner

Music
 "Love is What I Am" - Becky Bauch and The Boondock Sisters
 "Mickey Mouse March" (background)

Reception
The film's reception was poor.

Lawsuit
In 1975, Larry G. Spangler was sued by Walt Disney Productions for the film's use of the "Mickey Mouse March". Judgement went against the producers, as the march was used excessively, negating their claim of parody and fair use. It was cited in Walt Disney Productions v. Air Pirates.

References

External links
 
 The Life and Times of Xaviera Hollander at IAFD
 The Life and Times of Xaviera Hollander at allmovies
 
 Xaviera Hollander's Award Winning Documentary: THE HAPPY HOOKER, PORTRAIT OF A SEXUAL REVOLUTIONARY
 "Xaviera Hollander: Is the Happy Hooker still happy after all these years?"

1974 films
Films shot in New York City
American pornographic films
1970s pornographic films
Films about prostitution in the United States
Cultural depictions of Xaviera Hollander
1970s English-language films
1970s American films